Lawrence Counselman Wroth (January 14, 1884 – December 25, 1970) was an American historian and the author of The Colonial Printer, the definitive book on the American printing trade during the period of 1639 through 1800. Though he wrote hundreds of articles or books, Wroth was also a librarian and research professor.

Early years
Wroth was born in Baltimore, Maryland in 1884, the son of an Episcopal clergyman. He served with the 110th and 111th Field Artillery in World War I during the period of 1917 to 1919 in France.

Career
In 1905, Wroth graduated from Johns Hopkins University and wrote his first published article, "Sanitation in the Country House", which appeared in the magazine Country Life in America. His first book, published in 1911, Parson Weems; a biographical and critical study, was a biography of George Washington's biographer. His last book, published in 1970, The voyages of Giovanni da Verrazzano, 1524-1528, was also a biography.

Though Wroth wrote over 550 pieces, he is most notable for two books on colonial printing: A History of Printing in Colonial Maryland: 1686-1776, published in 1922,  a study of printing in colonial Maryland; and The Colonial Printer, published in 1931, a study in the printing trade during the American colonial period. Both books detailed the first colonial printing presses, colonial printing houses, typeset, printing ink, paper, journeymen, apprentices, conditions of the trade, and bookbinding. The content and finish of the completed books, pamphlets, and papers of the period are also discussed.

In his publications on printing in colonial America, Wroth notably included the history of colonial women printers, such as: Dinah Nuthead, Anne Catherine Hoof Green, Sarah Updike Goddard, Clementina Rind, and Mary Goddard.

Wroth expressly stated that the book was written "as a discussion of certain fundamental aspects of cultural history" and that the book was not intended as an "essay in bibliophilism", though his love of books is evident:
"To love the contents of a book and care nothing about the volume itself, to love the treasure and to be unmindful of the earthen vessel that loyally holds and preserves it, is to be only half a lover, deaf to a whole series of notes in the gamut of emotion.  The book lover, more richly endowed, broods over the hand that fashioned the volume he reads, and, like the Tramp-Royal, he goes on until he dies observing the different ways that different things are done, the materials, the processes, the how and what and why of the ancient mysteries of printing, paper making, type founding, ink making, press building, and binding."

In addition to writing, Wroth had a parallel career as a librarian. He worked at the Maryland Diocesan Library in Baltimore from 1905 to 1912 before becoming assistant librarian at Baltimore's Enoch Pratt Free Library from 1912 to 1923. While at Brown University in Providence, Rhode Island, Wroth served as librarian of the John Carter Brown Library for 35 years (1924 — 1957), and held a university post as Research Professor of American History (1932–1965).

References

 

1884 births
1970 deaths
20th-century American historians
American male non-fiction writers
American librarians
Brown University faculty
Johns Hopkins University alumni
Writers from Baltimore
Historians of the Thirteen Colonies
20th-century American Episcopalians
Historians from Maryland
20th-century American male writers
AIGA medalists
Presidents of the Bibliographical Society of America